Chatarius "Tutu" Atwell (born October 7, 1999) is an American football wide receiver for the Los Angeles Rams of the National Football League (NFL). He played college football at Louisville, and was drafted by the Rams in the second round of the 2021 NFL Draft.

Early years
Atwell attended Miami Northwestern Senior High School in Miami, Florida. He played quarterback in high school and was a four-year starter. As a senior, he was the Miami-Dade County Player of the Year. Atwell committed to the University of Louisville to play college football.

College career
Atwell was switched to wide receiver at Louisville. As a freshman in 2018, he played in 12 games, recording 24 receptions for 406 yards and two touchdowns. As a sophomore in 2019, he started 11 of 13 games, finishing with 70 receptions for 1,276 yards and 12 touchdowns. The 1,276 yards led the ACC and broke Harry Douglas' school record. On December 8, 2020, Atwell announced that he would opt out for the remainder of the 2020 season due to an undisclosed injury. In addition, he decided to forgo his senior year and enter the 2021 NFL Draft.

Professional career

Atwell was selected by the Los Angeles Rams in the second round (57th overall) of the 2021 NFL Draft. On May 14, Atwell signed his four-year rookie contract with the Rams. He played in eight games before being placed on injured reserve on November 2, 2021. He finished his rookie year with zero catches and was mainly used as a return specialist. In 2022, Atwell won Super Bowl LVI when the Rams defeated the Cincinnati Bengals 23-20.
.

Personal life
Atwell's father, Tutu Atwell Sr., was a star wide receiver at the University of Minnesota (1994-1997), ranking fourth in career receiving yards and sixth in career touchdowns.

References

External links
Louisville Cardinals bio

1999 births
Living people
Miami Northwestern Senior High School alumni
Players of American football from Miami
American football wide receivers
Louisville Cardinals football players
Los Angeles Rams players